English is an English surname. Notable people with the surname include:
Alex English (born 1954), American basketball player
Arthur English (1919–1995), English actor and comedian
Bill English (born 1961), New Zealand politician and Prime Minister
Bill English (actor) (born 1980), American actor
Bradford English (born 1943), American actor
CariDee English (born 1984), American model
Carl English (born 1981), Canadian basketball player and manager
David English (cricketer) (1946–2022), British cricketer and actor
Diane English (born 1948), American film director
Ernest English (1874–1941), British soldier, cricketer and actor
Fanita English (1916–2022), Romanian-born American psychoanalyst and psychotherapist
Felix English (born 1992), British-born Irish racing cyclist
George English (disambiguation), multiple people
Gerald English (1925–2019), English-Australian singer
Glenn English (born 1940), American politician
Grace English (1891–1956), English artist
Harris English (born 1989), American golfer
Isaac English (born 1971), Scottish footballer
Jack English (disambiguation), multiple people
James English (disambiguation), multiple people
Jane English (born 1942), American physicist, photographer, journalist and translator
Jane English (politician) (born 1940), American politician from Arkansas
Joe English (disambiguation), multiple people
John English (disambiguation), multiple people
Jo Jo English (born 1970), American NBA basketball player, top scorer in the 1999-2000 Israel Basketball League
Jon English (1949–2016), Australian singer and actor
Joseph English (disambiguation), multiple people
Karan English (born 1949), American politician
Katreeya English (born 1976), Thai singer and actress
Kim English (1970–2019), American singer
Kim English (basketball) (born 1988), American former basketball player and coach
Logan English (1928–1983), American singer, poet and actor
Mark English (athlete) (born 1993), Irish middle-distance runner
Matty English (born 1997), English rugby league footballer
Michael English (disambiguation), multiple people
Mitch English (born 1969), American talk show host
Nicky English (born 1962), Irish hurler
Paul English (drummer) (1932–2020), American country drummer
Paul M. English (born 1963), American computer businessman
Phil English (born 1956), U.S. Representative from Pennsylvania
Richard English (born 1963), Northern Irish historian
Richard English (cricketer), English cricketer
Robert English (disambiguation), multiple people
Ron English (American football) (born 1968), American football coach
Ron English (artist) (born 1959), American artist
Scott English (1937–2018), American songwriter and record producer
Scott English (basketball) (born 1950), American basketball player
Terence English (born 1932), English cardiac surgeon
Terry English, English armourer
Theo English (1930–2021), Irish hurler
Thomas English (disambiguation), several people
Tony English (born 1966), English footballer
William English (disambiguation), multiple people
Woody English (1906–1997), American baseball player

Fictional characters
Jake English, character in the web-comic Homestuck
Johnny English, British spy in the Johnny English film series

See also
Derek Hay (born 1964), British porn actor known as Ben English
Matthew Rehwoldt (born 1987), American wrestler known as Aiden English
Jack English Hightower (1926–2013), American Democratic politician
William English Kirwan (born 1938), chancellor of the University System of Maryland
William English Walling (1877–1936), American labor reformer and socialist
Englisch
Inglis (surname)

English-language surnames
English toponymic surnames
Ethnonymic surnames